The International Council on English Braille (ICEB) is the standardization body of braille for Australia, Canada, New Zealand, Nigeria, South Africa, the United Kingdom, and the United States. The ICEB braille standard is Unified English Braille, which by late 2012 had been accepted by all member states.

References

External links
ICEB.org

Braille organizations